The IBSF World Billiards Championship (previously known as the World Amateur Billiards Championship) is the premier, international, non-professional tournament for the game of English billiards.  Dating to some form to 1951, the event has been sanctioned by the International Billiards and Snooker Federation since 1973.

History 

Prior to 1951, when the first "world amateur" championship was held under the auspices of the Billiards Association and Control Council (based in London), this event was called the [British] Empire Billiards Championship.

In 1971, after many years' discussion, the World Billiards & Snooker Council was formed, changing its name in 1973 to the International Billiards & Snooker Federation. The name change came about because of the disquiet of many overseas national associations that the same body should oversee both the English domestic game and the game at international level. Consequently, the IBSF took control of the organisation of the non-professional championships of both snooker and billiards. The first winner from outside the British Commonwealth did not occur until 1999.

From 2012 to 2015, the IBSF World Billiards Championship was merged with the World Professional Billiards Championship. Under the name World Billiards Championship, tournaments were held in both points and timed format.

Champions

Men

Women
Since 2015:

Juniors

Summary

Men

Women

See also
World Women's Billiards Championship
Women's Professional Billiards Championship

References 

 IBSF past champions

World championships in English billiards